Babbington is an English surname. Notable people with the surname include: 

Kylie Babbington (born 1987), British actress
Roy Babbington (born 1940), English rock and jazz bassist

See also
Babington (surname)

English-language surnames